Spilarctia mahaplaga is a moth in the family Erebidae. It was described by Karel Černý in 2011. It is found in the Philippines.

References

External links

M
Endemic fauna of the Philippines
Moths of the Philippines
Moths described in 2011